Valfloriana is a comune (municipality) in Trentino in the northern Italian region Trentino-Alto Adige/Südtirol, located about  northeast of Trento.

Valfloriana borders the following municipalities: Capriana, Altrei, Castello-Molina di Fiemme, Sover, Lona-Lases, Telve and Baselga di Pinè.

Demographic evolution

References

Cities and towns in Trentino-Alto Adige/Südtirol